The dash is a punctuation mark consisting of a long horizontal line. It is similar in appearance to the hyphen but is longer and sometimes higher from the baseline. The most common versions are the endash , generally longer than the hyphen but shorter than the minus sign; the emdash , longer than either the en dash or the minus sign; and the horizontalbar , whose length varies across typefaces but tends to be between those of the en and em dashes.

History 

In the early 17th century, in Okes-printed plays of William Shakespeare, dashes are attested that indicate a thinking pause, interruption, mid-speech realization, or change of subject. The dashes are variously longer  (as in King Lear reprinted 1619) or composed of hyphens  (as in Othello printed 1622); moreover, the dashes are often, but not always, prefixed by a comma, colon, or semicolon.

Blot out, correct, insert, refine,
Enlarge, diminish, interline;
Be mindful, when Invention fails;
To scratch your Head, and bite your Nails.

Your poem finish'd, next your Care
Is needful, to transcribe it fair.
In modern Wit all printed Trash, is
Set off with num'rous Breaks⸺and Dashes—

Types of dash 
Usage varies both within English and within other languages, but the usual conventions for the most common dashes in printed English text are these:

 An (unspaced) em dash or a spaced en dash can be used to mark a break in a sentence, and a pair can be used to set off a parenthetical statement. For example:
  
  
 An en dash, but not an em dash, indicates spans or differentiation, where it may replace "and", "to", or "through". For example: 

 An em dash or horizontal bar, but not an en dash, is used to set off the source of a direct quotation. For example: 

 A horizontal bar (also called quotation dash) or the em dash, but not the en dash, introduces quoted text.

Figure dash 
The figure dash  has the same width as a numerical digit. (Most fonts have digits of equal width.) It is used within numbers such as the phone number 555‒0199, especially in columns so as to maintain alignment. In contrast, the en dash  is generally used for a range of values. 

The minus sign  glyph is generally set a little higher, so as to be level with the horizontal bar of the plus sign.

In informal usage, the hyphen-minus , provided as standard on most keyboards, is often used instead of the figure dash. 

In TeX, the standard fonts have no figure dash; however, the digits normally all have the same width as the en dash, so an en dash can be a substitution for the figure dash. In XeLaTeX, one can use \char"2012. The Linux Libertine font also has the figure dash glyph.

En dash 

The en dash, en rule, or nut dash  is traditionally half the width of an em dash.
In modern fonts, the length of the en dash is not standardized, and the en dash is often more than half the width of the em dash. The widths of en and em dashes have also been specified as being equal to those of the upper-case letters N and M, respectively,
and at other times to the widths of the lower-case letters.

Usage 

The three main uses of the en dash are 
 to connect symmetric items, such as the two ends of a range or two competitors or alternatives
 as a substitute for a hyphen in a compound when one of the connected items is more complex than a single word
 as an interruptor at sentence level, substituting for a pair of commas, parentheses, or to indicate a rhetorical pause. It is usually held that, when used as an interruptor, the en dash should be "open"spaced on both sidesin contrast to the em dash, which is usually closed; a common exception  is in newspapers.

Ranges of values 
The en dash is commonly used to indicate a closed range of valuesa range with clearly defined and finite upper and lower boundariesroughly signifying what might otherwise be communicated by the word "through" in American English, or "to" in International English. This may include ranges such as those between dates, times, or numbers. Various style guides restrict this range indication style to only parenthetical or tabular matter, requiring "to" or "through" in running text. Preference for hyphen vs. en dash in ranges varies. For example, the APA style (named after the American Psychological Association) uses an en dash in ranges, but the AMA style (named after the American Medical Association) uses a hyphen:

Some style guides (including the Guide for the Use of the International System of Units (SI) and the AMA Manual of Style) recommend that, when a number range might be misconstrued as subtraction, the word "to" should be used instead of an en dash. For example, "a voltage of 50 V to 100 V" is preferable to using "a voltage of 50–100 V". Relatedly, in ranges that include negative numbers, "to" is used to avoid ambiguity or awkwardness (for example, "temperatures ranged from −18°C to −34°C"). It is also considered poor style (best avoided) to use the en dash in place of the words "to" or "and" in phrases that follow the forms from X to Y and between X and Y.

Relationships and connections 
The en dash is used to contrast values or illustrate a relationship between two things. Examples of this usage include:
 Australia beat American Samoa 31–0.
 Radical–Unionist coalition
 Boston–Hartford route
 New York–London flight (however, it may be argued that New York–to-London flight is more appropriate because New York is a single name composed of two valid words; with a single en dash, the phrase is ambiguous and could mean either Flight from New York to London or New flight from York to London; such ambiguity is assuaged when used mid-sentence, though, because of the capital N in "New" indicating it is a special noun). If dash–hyphen use becomes too unwieldy or difficult to understand, the sentence can be rephrased for clarity and readability; for example, "The flight from New York to London was a pleasant experience".
 Mother–daughter relationship
 The Supreme Court voted 5–4 to uphold the decision.

A distinction is often made between "simple" attributive compounds (written with a hyphen) and other subtypes (written with an en dash); at least one authority considers name pairs, where the paired elements carry equal weight, as in the Taft–Hartley Act to be "simple", while others consider an en dash appropriate in instances such as these to represent the parallel relationship, as in the McCain–Feingold bill or Bose–Einstein statistics. When an act of the U.S. Congress is named using the surnames of the senator and representative who sponsored it, the hyphen-minus is used in the short title; thus, the short title of Public Law 111–203 is "The Dodd-Frank Wall Street Reform and Consumer Protection Act", with a hyphen-minus rather than an en dash between "Dodd" and "Frank". However, there is a difference between something named for a parallel/coordinate relationship between two people for example, Satyendra Nath Bose and Albert Einstein and something named for a single person who had a compound surname, which may be written with a hyphen or a space but not an en dashfor example, the Lennard-Jones potential [hyphen] is named after one person (John Lennard-Jones), as are Bence Jones proteins and Hughlings Jackson syndrome. Copyeditors use dictionaries (general, medical, biographical, and geographical) to confirm the eponymity (and thus the styling) for specific terms, given that no one can know them all offhand.

Preference for an en dash instead of a hyphen in these coordinate/relationship/connection types of terms is a matter of style, not inherent orthographic "correctness"; both are equally "correct", and each is the preferred style in some style guides. For example, the American Heritage Dictionary of the English Language, the AMA Manual of Style, and Dorland's medical reference works use hyphens, not en dashes, in coordinate terms (such as "blood-brain barrier"), in eponyms (such as "Cheyne-Stokes respiration", "Kaplan-Meier method"), and so on.

Attributive compounds 
In English, the en dash is usually used instead of a hyphen in compound (phrasal) attributives in which one or both elements is itself a compound, especially when the compound element is an open compound, meaning it is not itself hyphenated. This manner of usage may include such examples as:
 The hospital–nursing home connection (the connection between the hospital and the nursing home, not a home connection between the hospital and nursing)
 A nursing home–home care policy (a policy about the nursing home and home care)
 Pre–Civil War era
 Pulitzer Prize–winning novel
 New York–style pizza
 The non–San Francisco part of the world
 The post–World War II era
 (Compare post-war era, which, if not fully compounded (postwar), takes a hyphen, not an en dash. The difference is that war is not an open compound, whereas World War II is.)
 Trans–New Guinea languages
 The ex–prime minister
 a long–focal length camera
 water ice–based bedrock
 The pro-conscription–anti-conscription debate
 Public-school–private-school rivalries

The disambiguating value of the en dash in these patterns was illustrated by Strunk and White in The Elements of Style with the following example: When Chattanooga News and Chattanooga Free Press merged, the joint company was inaptly named Chattanooga News-Free Press (using a hyphen), which could be interpreted as meaning that their newspapers were news-free.

An exception to the use of en dashes is usually made when prefixing an already-hyphenated compound; an en dash is generally avoided as a distraction in this case. Examples of this include:
 non-English-speaking air traffic controllers
 semi-labor-intensive industries
 Proto-Indo-European language
 The post-MS-DOS era
 non-government-owned corporations

An en dash can be retained to avoid ambiguity, but whether any ambiguity is plausible is a judgment call. AMA style retains the en dashes in the following examples:
 non–self-governing
 non–English-language journals
 non–group-specific blood
 non–Q-wave myocardial infarction
 non–brain-injured subjects

Differing recommendations 
As discussed above, the en dash is sometimes recommended instead of a hyphen in compound adjectives where neither part of the adjective modifies the other—that is, when each modifies the noun, as in love–hate relationship.

The Chicago Manual of Style (CMOS), however, limits the use of the en dash to two main purposes:
 First, use it to indicate ranges of time, money, or other amounts, or in certain other cases where it replaces the word "to".
 Second, use it in place of a hyphen in a compound adjective when one of the elements of the adjective is an open compound, or when two or more of its elements are compounds, open or hyphenated.

That is, the CMOS favors hyphens in instances where some other guides suggest en dashes, with the 16th edition explaining that "Chicago's sense of the en dash does not extend to between", to rule out its use in "US–Canadian relations".

In these two uses, en dashes normally do not have spaces around them. Some make an exception when they believe avoiding spaces may cause confusion or look odd. However, other authorities disagree and state there should be no space between an en dash and adjacent text.

Parenthetic and other uses at the sentence level 

En dashes can be used instead of pairs of commas that mark off a nested clause or phrase. They can also be used around parenthetical expressions such as this one rather than the em dashes preferred by some publishers.

The en dash can also signify a rhetorical pause. For example, an opinion piece from The Guardian is entitled: 
Who is to blame for the sweltering weather? My kids say it's boomersand me

In these situations, en dashes must have a single space on each side.

Itemization mark 

Either the en dash or the em dash may be used as a bullet at the start of each item in a bulleted list. (This is a matter of graphic design rather than orthography.)

Typography

Spacing 
In most uses of en dashes, such as when used in indicating ranges, they are closed up to the joined words. It is only when en dashes are used in setting off parenthetical expressionssuch as this onethat they take spaces around them. For more on the choice of em versus en in this context, see En dash versus em dash.

Encoding and substitution 
When an en dash is unavailable in a particular character encoding environment—as in the ASCII character set—there are some conventional substitutions. Often two consecutive hyphens are the substitute.

The en dash is encoded in Unicode as U+2013 (decimal 8211) and represented in HTML by the named character entity &ndash;.

The en dash is sometimes used as a substitute for the minus sign, when the minus sign character is not available since the en dash is usually the same width as a plus sign and is often available when the minus sign is not; see below. For example, the original 8-bit Macintosh Character Set had an en dash, useful for the minus sign, years before Unicode with a dedicated minus sign was available. The hyphen-minus is usually too narrow to make a typographically acceptable minus sign. However, the en dash cannot be used for a minus sign in programming languages because the syntax usually requires a hyphen-minus.

Em dash 
The em dash, em rule, or mutton dash  is longer than an en dash. The character is called an em dash because it is one em wide, a length that varies depending on the font size. One em is the same length as the font's height (which is typically measured in points). So in 9-point type, an em dash is nine points wide, while in 24-point type the em dash is 24 points wide. By comparison, the en dash, with its  width, is in most fonts either a half-em wide
or the width of an upper-case "N".

The em dash is encoded in Unicode as U+2014 (decimal 8212) and represented in HTML by the named character entity &mdash;.

Usage 

The em dash is used in several ways. It is primarily used in places where a set of parentheses or a colon might otherwise be used, and it can also show an abrupt change in thought (or an interruption in speech) or be used where a full stop (period) is too strong and a comma is too weak. Em dashes are also used to set off summaries or definitions. Common uses and definitions are cited below with examples.

Colon-like use

Simple equivalence (or near-equivalence) of colon and em dash 
 Three alkali metals are the usual substituents: sodium, potassium, and lithium.
 Three alkali metals are the usual substituents—sodium, potassium, and lithium.

Inversion of the function of a colon 
 These are the colors of the flag: red, white, and blue.
 Red, white, and blue—these are the colors of the flag.

Parenthesis-like use

Simple equivalence (or near-equivalence) of paired parenthetical marks 
 Compare parentheses with em dashes:
 Three alkali metals (sodium, potassium, and lithium) are the usual substituents.
 Three alkali metals—sodium, potassium, and lithium—are the usual substituents.
 Compare commas, em dashes and parentheses (respectively) when no internal commas intervene:
 The food, which was delicious, reminded me of home.
 The food—which was delicious—reminded me of home.
 The food (which was delicious) reminded me of home.

Subtle differences in punctuation 

It may indicate an interpolation stronger than that demarcated by parentheses, as in the following from Nicholson Baker's The Mezzanine (the degree of difference is subjective).
 "At that age I once stabbed my best friend, Fred, with a pair of pinking shears in the base of the neck, enraged because he had been given the comprehensive sixty-four-crayon Crayola box—including the gold and silver crayons—and would not let me look closely at the box to see how Crayola had stabilized the built-in crayon sharpener under the tiers of crayons."

Interruption of a speaker

Interruption by someone else 

 "But I'm trying to explain that I—" "I'm aware of your mitigating circumstances, but your negative attitude was excessive."

In a related use, it may visually indicate the shift between speakers when they overlap in speech. For example, the em dash is used this way in Joseph Heller's Catch-22:
 He was Cain, Ulysses, the Flying Dutchman; he was Lot in Sodom, Deirdre of the Sorrows, Sweeney in the nightingales among trees. He was the miracle ingredient Z-147. He was— "Crazy!" Clevinger interrupted, shrieking. "That's what you are! Crazy!""—immense. I'm a real, slam-bang, honest-to-goodness, three-fisted humdinger. I'm a bona fide supraman."

Self-interruption 
 Simple revision of a statement as one's thoughts evolve on the fly:
 "I believe I shall—no, I'm going to do it."
 Contemplative or emotional trailing off (usually in dialogue or in first person narrative):
 "I sense something; a presence I've not felt since—" in Star Wars Episode IV: A New Hope.
 "Get out or else—"
 Either an ellipsis or an em dash can indicate aposiopesis, the rhetorical device by which a sentence is stopped short not because of interruption, but because the speaker is too emotional or pensive to continue. Because the ellipsis is the more common choice, an em dash for this purpose may be ambiguous in expository text, as many readers would assume interruption, although it may be used to indicate great emotion in dramatic monologue.
 Long pause:
 In Early Modern English texts and afterward, em dashes have been used to add long pauses (as noted in Joseph Robertson's 1785 An Essay On Punctuation):

Quotation

Quotation mark–like use 

This is a quotation dash. It may be distinct from an em dash in its coding (see horizontal bar). It may be used to indicate turns in a dialogue, in which case each dash starts a paragraph. It replaces other quotation marks and was preferred by authors such as James Joyce:
 ―O saints above! miss Douce said, sighed above her jumping rose. I wished I hadn't laughed so much. I feel all wet.
 ―O, miss Douce! miss Kennedy protested. You horrid thing!

Attribution of quote source 
 Inline quotes:
 A penny saved is a penny earned. — Benjamin Franklin
 Block quotes:

Redaction 

An em dash may be used to indicate omitted letters in a word redacted to an initial or single letter or to fillet a word, by leaving the start and end letters whilst replacing the middle letters with a dash or dashes (for censorship or simply data anonymization). It may also censor the end letter. In this use, it is sometimes doubled.
 It was alleged that D⸺ had been threatened with blackmail.
Three em dashes might be used to indicate a completely missing word.

Itemization mark 
Either the en dash or the em dash may be used as a bullet at the start of each item in a bulleted list, but a plain hyphen is more commonly used.

Repetition 
Three em dashes one after another can be used in a footnote, endnote, or another form of bibliographic entry to indicate repetition of the same author's name as that of the previous work, which is similar to the use of

Typographic details

Spacing and substitution 
According to most American sources (such as The Chicago Manual of Style) and some British sources (such as The Oxford Guide to Style), an em dash should always be set closed, meaning it should not be surrounded by spaces. But the practice in some parts of the English-speaking world, including the style recommended by The New York Times Manual of Style and Usage for printed newspapers and the AP Stylebook, sets it open, separating it from its surrounding words by using spaces or hair spaces (U+200A) when it is being used parenthetically. The AP Stylebook rejects the use of the open em dash to set off introductory items in lists. However, the "space, en dash, space" sequence is the predominant style in German and French typography. (See En dash versus em dash below.)

In Canada, The Canadian Style: A Guide to Writing and Editing, The Oxford Canadian A to Z of Grammar, Spelling & Punctuation: Guide to Canadian English Usage (2nd ed.), Editing Canadian English, and the Canadian Oxford Dictionary all specify that an em dash should be set closed when used between words, a word and numeral, or two numerals.

The Australian government's Style Manual for Authors, Editors and Printers (6th ed.), also specifies that em dashes inserted between words, a word and numeral, or two numerals, should be set closed. A section on the 2-em rule (⸺) also explains that the 2-em can be used to mark an abrupt break in direct or reported speech, but a space is used before the 2-em if a complete word is missing, while no space is used if part of a word exists before the sudden break. Two examples of this are as follows:
 I distinctly heard him say, "Go away or I'll ⸺".
 It was alleged that D⸺ had been threatened with blackmail.

Approximating the em dash with two or three hyphens 
When an em dash is unavailable in a particular character encoding environment—as in the ASCII character set—it has usually been approximated as consecutive double (--) or triple (---) hyphen-minuses. The two-hyphen em dash proxy is perhaps more common, being a widespread convention in the typewriting era. (It is still described for hard copy manuscript preparation in the Chicago Manual of Style as of the 16th edition, although the manual conveys that typewritten manuscript and copyediting on paper are now dated practices.) The three-hyphen em dash proxy was popular with various publishers because the sequence of one, two, or three hyphens could then correspond to the hyphen, en dash, and em dash, respectively.

Because early comic book letterers were not aware of the typographic convention of replacing a typewritten double hyphen with an em dash, the double hyphen became traditional in American comics. This practice has continued despite the development of computer lettering.

En dash versus em dash 

The en dash is wider than the hyphen but not as wide as the em dash. An em width is defined as the point size of the currently used font, since the M character is not always the width of the point size. In running text, various dash conventions are employed: an em dash—like so—or a spaced em dash — like so — or a spaced en dashlike socan be seen in contemporary publications.

Various style guides and national varieties of languages prescribe different guidance on dashes. Dashes have been cited as being treated differently in the US and the UK, with the former preferring the use of an em dash with no additional spacing and the latter preferring a spaced en dash. As examples of the US style, The Chicago Manual of Style and The Publication Manual of the American Psychological Association recommend unspaced em dashes. Style guides outside the US are more variable. For example, The Elements of Typographic Style by Canadian typographer Robert Bringhurst recommends the spaced en dashlike soand argues that the length and visual magnitude of an em dash "belongs to the padded and corseted aesthetic of Victorian typography".
In the United Kingdom, the spaced en dash is the house style for certain major publishers, including the Penguin Group, the Cambridge University Press, and Routledge. However, this convention is not universal. The Oxford Guide to Style (2002, section 5.10.10) acknowledges that the spaced en dash is used by "other British publishers" but states that the Oxford University Press, like "most US publishers", uses the unspaced em dash.

The en dashalways with spaces in running text when, as discussed in this section, indicating a parenthesis or pauseand the spaced em dash both have a certain technical advantage over the unspaced em dash. Most typesetting and word processing expects word spacing to vary to support full justification. Alone among punctuation that marks pauses or logical relations in text, the unspaced em dash disables this for the words it falls between. This can cause uneven spacing in the text, but can be mitigated by the use of thin spaces, hair spaces, or even zero-width spaces on the sides of the em dash. This provides the appearance of an unspaced em dash, but allows the words and dashes to break between lines. The spaced em dash risks introducing excessive separation of words. In full justification, the adjacent spaces may be stretched, and the separation of words further exaggerated. En dashes may also be preferred to em dashes when text is set in narrow columns, such as in newspapers and similar publications, since the en dash is smaller. In such cases, its use is based purely on space considerations and is not necessarily related to other typographical concerns.

On the other hand, a spaced en dash may be ambiguous when it is also used for ranges, for example, in dates or between geographical locations with internal spaces.

Horizontal bar 

The horizontal bar, also known as a quotation dash, is used to introduce quoted text. This is the standard method of printing dialogue in some languages. The em dash is equally suitable if the quotation dash is unavailable or is contrary to the house style being used.

There is no support in the standard TeX fonts, but one can use \hbox{---}\kern-.5em--- or an em dash.

Swung dash 

The swung dash resembles a lengthened tilde and is used to separate alternatives or approximates. In dictionaries, it is frequently used to stand in for the term being defined. A dictionary entry providing an example for the term henceforth might employ the swung dash as follows:

henceforth (adv.) from this time forth; from now on; "⁓ she will be known as Mrs. Wales"

Typing the characters 
Typewriters and computers often have no key that produces a dash. In consequence, it became common to use the hyphen. It is common for a single hyphen surrounded by spaces to represent an en dash, and for two hyphens to represent an em dash. (A hyphen surrounded by other characters is a hyphen, with a space before it or with digits it is a minus sign.)

Modern word-processing software typically has support for many more characters and is usually capable of rendering both the en and em dashes correctly—albeit sometimes with an inconvenient input method. Techniques for generating em and en dashes in various operating systems, word processors and markup languages are provided in the following table:

Unicode

In other languages 
In many languages, such as Polish, the em dash is used as an opening quotation mark. There is no matching closing quotation mark; typically a new paragraph will be started, introduced by a dash, for each turn in the dialogue.

Corpus studies indicate that em dashes are more commonly used in Russian than in English. In Russian, the em dash is used for the present copula (meaning "am"/"is"/"are"), which is unpronounced in spoken Russian.

In French, em or en dashes can be used as parentheses (brackets), but the use of a second dash as a closing parenthesis is optional. When a closing dash is not used, the sentence is ended with a period (full-stop) as usual. Dashes are, however, much less common than parentheses.

In Spanish, em dashes can be used to mark off parenthetical phrases. Unlike in English, the em dashes are spaced like brackets, i.e., there is a space between main sentence and dash, but not between parenthetical phrase and dash.

See also 
 Leiden Conventions – rules to indicate conditions in texts (usage of "[— — —]")
 Signature dashes – signature delimiter in emails (usage of "-- " in a single line)
 Whitespace characters – spaces of equivalent sizes to dashes

Explanatory notes

References

External links 

 Wiktionary list of English phrases with em dash
 Dashes and Hyphens
 Commonly confused characters

Punctuation
Typography